The 1990 United States Shadow Senator election in the District of Columbia took place on November 6, 1990, to elect two shadow members to the United States Senate to represent the District of Columbia. The members were only recognized by the District of Columbia and not officially sworn or seated by the United States Senate.

In this election candidates for both seats ran in the same general election (with two candidates advancing from any party primary), and the top two candidates by popular vote became the Shadow Senators for the District of Columbia. Democrats Jesse Jackson and Florence Pendleton would be elected to become the first senators of the District of Columbia, Jackson became the Class 2 senator while Pendleton became the Class 1 senator.

Primary elections 
Party primaries took place on September 11, 1990.

Democratic primary

Candidates 
 James Forman, civil rights activist
 Marc Humphries, community activist
 Jesse Jackson, civil rights activist candidate for President in 1988
 Florence Pendleton, Advisory Neighborhood Commissioner
 Harry Thomas Jr., Advisory Neighborhood Commissioner

Results

General election 
Jackson and Pendleton faced Republicans Milton Francis and Joan Gillison as well as several independents and members of minor parties. Both Democrats were elected as senators for the district because they received more votes than any other candidates

Candidates 
 Jesse Jackson (Democratic)
 Florence Pendleton (Democratic)
 Harry T. Alexander (Independent)
 Milton Francis (Republican)
 Joan Gillison (Republican)
 Keith M. Wilkerson (D.C. Statehood)
 Anthony W. Peacock (D.C. Statehood)
 John West (Independent)
 David L. Whitehead (Independent)
 Sam Manuel (Socialist Workers)
 Lee Black (Independent)

Results

References 

United States Shadow Senator
1990